"Never Trust a Stranger" is a song by English singer Kim Wilde, released as the third single from her sixth album, Close (1988). Remixed from the original album track by producer Ricki Wilde, it was released in the autumn of 1988 following the best-selling hit "You Came" and several European tour dates supporting Michael Jackson. It became another big hit in Europe, peaking within the top 10 in Austria, Belgium, Denmark, Ireland, the Netherlands, Switzerland and United Kingdom. An extended version of the single remix was released on the 12" and CD-single formats, and a different remix ('Sanjazz") was released in the UK on an alternative 12" single.

Track listing
 7": MCA / KIM 9 (UK)
 "Never Trust A Stranger" - 4:07
 "Wotcha Gonna Do" - 4:07
Note: Also available in gatefold sleeve (MCA / KIMSG9)

 12": MCA / KIMT 9 (UK)
 "Never Trust A Stranger" (Julian Mendelsohn Extended Version) - 6:02
 "You Came" (Shep Pettibone Remix) - 7:37
 "Wotcha Gonna Do" - 4:00
Note: Also available on CD (MCA / DKIM9)

 12": MCA / KIMX 9 (UK)
 "Never Trust A Stranger" (The Sanjazz Mix)
 "Wotcha Gonna Do" - 4:00
 "Never Trust A Stranger" - 4:07

Charts

Weekly charts

Year-end charts

Covers
Spanish singer Mónica Naranjo released a Spanish language version titled "Hoy No (Never Trust a Stranger)" on her 2020 EP Mes Excentricités Vol. 2: Les Quatre Saisons.

References

1988 singles
1988 songs
Kim Wilde songs
Songs written by Kim Wilde
Songs written by Ricky Wilde